Conrad Moench (sometimes written Konrad Mönch; 15 August 1744 – 6 January 1805) was a German botanist, professor of botany at Marburg University from 1786 until his death.

He wrote 'Methodus Plantas horti botanici et agri Marburgensis' in 1794, an arranged account of plants in the fields and gardens of Marburg.
In 1802 he named the plant Gillenia trifoliata in a supplement to a local flora of the city of Marburg. He also named the plant genus Echinacea (1794).

The botanical genus Moenchia (family Caryophyllaceae) is named in his honor.

The standard botanical author abbreviation Moench is applied to plants he described.

Principal writings 

 Enumeratio plantarum indigenarum Hassiae praesertim inferioris, secundum methodum sexualem dispositarum, 1777.
  (published in several editions)
 Systematische Lehre von denen gebräuchlichsten Einfachen und zusammengesezten Arzney-Mitteln : zum Gebrauch Akademischer Vorlesungen, 1795 – Systematic teaching of simple and compound medicines; academic lectures. 
 Einleitung zur Pflanzen-Kunde, 1798 – Introduction to botany.

References

Sources
 Johnson M. The Genus Clematis pp 89-90, 2001.
 Monroe WR. Analysis of the rhizome of Aralia californica. American Journal of Pharmacy volume 70 number 10, October 1898.

Bryologists
Pteridologists
Botanists with author abbreviations
1744 births
1805 deaths
Academic staff of the University of Marburg
Scientists from Kassel
18th-century German botanists